Vittadini is an Italian surname. Notable people with the surname include:

Adrienne Vittadini (born 1945), American fashion designer
Carlo Vittadini (1800–1865), Italian doctor and mycologist
Franco Vittadini (1884–1948), Italian composer and conductor
Rita Vittadini (1914–2000), Italian gymnast

See also
Premio Carlo Vittadini, a horse race in Italy

Italian-language surnames